7 Sins is a life simulation video game where the player must get to the top of the social ladder and make decisions related to the seven deadly sins. The game is set in the fictional Apple City. Throughout the game the player makes decisions based on pride, wrath, greed, envy, lust, sloth and gluttony. Once a relationship has been built new missions are unlocked. In total there are seven chapters and one hundred non-player characters to interact with.

PC Zone's staff rated the game 6 out of 10, stating "We can't wholeheartedly recommend 7 Sins as a total gaming experience..", but added "... it honestly isn't anywhere near as bad as some might tell you. They're just too timid to admit it."

See also
List of PlayStation 2 games

References

External links
7 Sins at GameSpot
7 Sins at IGN

7 Sins at GameSpy

2005 video games
Erotic video games
PlayStation 2 games
Windows games
Video games developed in France
Seven deadly sins in popular culture
Single-player video games
Digital Jesters games